Leon Jacobs (born October 3, 1995) is a Nigerian-American professional American football linebacker for the Michigan Panthers of the United States Football League (USFL). He played college football at Wisconsin. The San Pedro native holds the record for most games played by a Football Bowl Subdivision player having played in 59 NCAA contests.

Early years
Jacobs was born in Nigeria, the oldest of four children of Theresa, a nurse, and Tony, an entrepreneur. He was given an Igbo name, Somgolie Nwude. His brother, Chibueze, played college basketball at Sacramento State. His family immigrated to California around the time that Jacobs began attending school.

Jacobs played football as a freshman at Bishop Montgomery High School before quitting to focus on basketball. He did not resume playing football until he was a senior at Golden Valley High School in Santa Clarita, California.

College career 
Jacobs attended and played college football at Wisconsin. In 2015, his season was ended by a foot injury after four games. He was granted a medical hardship waiver and extra year of eligibility. Until 2016 he had played exclusively at linebacker. He played both linebacker and fullback in 2016 and returned to just the defensive side of the ball in 2017 as the Badgers needed to replace linebackers T. J. Watt and Vince Biegel.

Collegiate statistics

Professional career

Jacksonville Jaguars

Jacobs was drafted by the Jacksonville Jaguars in the seventh round (230th overall) of the 2018 NFL Draft. He played in 12 games with three starts. In Week 14, against the Tennessee Titans, he scored a safety when tackled Cameron Batson in the endzone. He was placed on injured reserve on December 14, 2018, with a quad injury. Overall, he finished his rookie season with 21 combined tackles.

Jacobs entered the 2020 season as a starting linebacker for the Jaguars. In Week 3, he suffered a torn ACL and was placed on injured reserve on September 28, 2020.

On July 30, 2021, Jacobs was released by the Jaguars.

Michigan Panthers
On December 13, 2022, Jacobs signed with the Michigan Panthers of the United States Football League (USFL).

References

External links
Jacksonville Jaguars bio
Wisconsin Badgers bio

1995 births
Living people
Sportspeople from Santa Clarita, California
People from San Pedro, Los Angeles
Players of American football from California
American football linebackers
Wisconsin Badgers football players
Jacksonville Jaguars players
Michigan Panthers (2022) players